Hemisphere GNSS designs and manufactures precision global positioning system and global navigation satellite system products and technology for positioning, heading, guidance, navigation, machine control, and L-band correction service applications. The company’s products and technology are used in agricultural, marine, surveying, GIS mapping, and machine control markets.

Hemisphere GNSS is headquartered in Scottsdale, Arizona; with product development facilities in Hiawatha, Kansas, Calgary, Canada, and Winnipeg, Canada.

Hemisphere GNSS is a privately held company that was created in 2013 when Hemisphere GPS was purchased by Beijing UniStrong Science & Technology, with Hemisphere GPS becoming AgJunction.

Atlas is a satellite-based augmentation system (SBAS) service owned and operated by Hemisphere GNSS. Atlas correction signals are proprietary, and a subscription must be purchased from Hemisphere GNSS in order to receive a subscription authorization. To access Atlas corrections the user must have an Atlas-capable receiver. Atlas-capable receivers are available from Hemisphere GNSS.

Products 

 Positioning
 Positioning and heading
 Peripherals
 Atlas GNSS-based global L-band correction service

External links 
 http://www.hemispheregnss.com - Hemisphere GNSS Home Page

References 

Geographic data and information equipment companies
Manufacturing companies of Canada
Satellite-based augmentation systems
Technology companies of Canada